John Ebenezer Samuel de Graft-Hayford (1912–2002) was Ghana's first Ghanaian Chief of Air Staff. He became the first indigenous Air Force Commander in Ghana and Black Sub-Saharan Africa. He was also acting Chief of Defence Staff (CDS) for a brief period in 1962.

He was born in the United Kingdom of Ghanaian origin, and also had Dutch and German maternal bloodlines.

Education
Born in the UK in 1912, he returned to Ghana with his parents and his newly born sister, Mary Ruth Ernestina, Edmondson (née Hayford), in 1914, commencing formal education in 1916 at the Baptist School in Accra. Between 1916 and 1922, he studied at a Pedagogium in Godesberg, Germany. He attended the Bellahouston Academy and Ibrox Public School in Glasgow, Scotland (1925–28), then went on to the Baptist Collegiate School, Accra (1929–30).

Between 1931 and 1939, he passed several courses in: Infantry and Army Signals Training, Shorthand, Typing and Short-Story Writing, qualifying through the Regent Institute of Journalism. In 1941, he passed the Royal Air Force RAF medical examination, after treatment for a broken jaw sustained in the sport of boxing, and passed the Non-Commissioned Officers courses in 1943.

In 1945, he studied course subjects as an external student of London University. He matriculated in September 1945. In 1946, he completed his inter-BSc Economics degree from London University in November 1947.

In 1951, he received his Diploma in Public Administration from London University by private study and was awarded the title of Fellow of the Economic Society of Ghana in 1958. In 1966, he gained his BSc in economics.

On 7 February 1964, he was elected Fellow of the Royal Economic Society.

Career
Between 1931 and 1939, de Graft-Hayford passed his Civil Service Examination and was employed as a Second Division Clerk then Assistant Officer Gazeteer and was also a broadcast announcer with a radio station called ZOY.

From June 1937 to December 1938, de Graft-Hayford together with the British Assistant Colonial Secretary Harold Cooper, and with the assistance of Dr. Ebenezer Ako-Adjei, organized and established the Gold Coast Broadcasting Service, the beginnings of what is now the Ghana Broadcasting Corporation GBC.

He enlisted with the 3rd Battalion Gold Coast Regiment, otherwise known as the Gold Coast Territorial Force, on 1 May 1939, specializing in Infantry and Army Signals Training. 
On 26 August 1939, he was mobilized with the 5th Battalion, Gold Coast Regiment, Royal West African Frontier Force (RWAFF). In 1940, he was promoted Sergeant and posted to command pay office. 
In 1941, he passed an interview for training as Fighter Pilot with the Royal Air Force (RAF). 
In 1942, he was a staff sergeant in command of the Pay Office in the Gambia, as well as having part-time attachment duties with the RAF. He was also on war office circular cancelling inter-service transfers and remained in the RWAFF.
In 1943 he was posted to the 6th battalion Gold Coast Regiment for training with a view to a commission in the infantry.
1944 saw him as an instructor for the Unit NCOs Cadre, specializing in battle drills, small arms and organization in the field of war. 
However he was debarred from commission in infantry by reason of notified age limit and continued with the 821 Company, West African Service Corps training, still with the aim of a commission in the Royal Service Corp.

In 1945, de Graft-Hayford, as a sergeant in 13 I.T.C. & Queen's Own Regiment in Maidstone, Kent, was recommended for training at a Royal Army Service Officer Cadet Training Unit. He was subsequently interviewed on 3 August 1945 by the War Office Selection Board at Golders Green, and was found suitable for training as an Officer at an Officer Training unit in Britain. He was now cadet 148 Pre-OCTU, Wrothram, Kent.

In 1946, he was Officer/Cadet at the Royal Army Service Corps Officer Training Centre, Aldershot.
 
De Graft-Hayford was only the third African to be commissioned lieutenant as a British officer in the Royal Army Service Corps Land Forces in 1946.

He served in North Africa and the UK, rising to the rank of captain, until demobilization from the armed forces in the United Kingdom on 14 June 1948. He continued working in the UK as assistant welfare and scholarships officer at the Colonial Office in London for a while then returned to Ghana.

Between 1948 and 1953, he was with the Gold Coast Cocoa Marketing Board. 
He initially worked as secretary/accountant, rising to the position of acting general manager. He was also during this period chairman of the Ghana Legion and a member of the Constitutional Assembly.

In the late 1950, he was recalled to the Ghana Armed Forces with the offer of the position of commanding officer, 1st Battalion of Infantry, Ghana Army Volunteer Force which he accepted.
 
In 1961, de Graft-Hayford was seconded to the 3rd Green Jackets Rifle Brigade, British Army of Occupation of Germany (for Senior Officers) Battle Training. He soon after gained promotion to lieutenant colonel and in 1962 to brigadier, re-designated air commodore and appointed Chief of Air Staff CAS Chief of the Air Staff taking over from Air Commodore John Whitworth.

In 1962, under Kwame Nkrumah's initiative the first National School of Gliding was successfully set up jointly by Hanna Reitsch, once Adolf Hitler's top personal pilot, and Air Commodore De Graft-Hayford, who during this period also held the positions of aide de camp to Nkrumah, then President of Ghana, and at the same time, the first Chief of the Air Staff and for brief period acting Chief of Defence Staff.

De Graft-Hayford was posted by Nkrumah to the Ghana High Commission in the UK as Ghana's first military attaché in 1963 and was actively involved in intelligence work.

He retired from the Ghana Armed Forces on 28 February 1965.

In 1966, still residing in the UK, he worked as a sales consultant for Encyclopædia Britannica and as the secretary of the British Legion Club situated in Fulham, London.

Soon after the downfall of Kwame Nkrumah and during the regime of Lieutenant General Joseph Ankrah, De Graft-Hayford was invited back to Ghana from the UK and offered senior appointments within the Government. He became the national organizer of the Ghana Workers Brigade (GWB) on 21 December 1966. On 10 September 1968, he was also Chairman of the National Emergency Food Supply Committee.

On 11 January 1972, he headed the Investigation Branch, Ghana Cocoa Marketing Board, then was re-designated Chief Security Officer.

From 1972 to 1974, he was the first Chairman of the Ghana branch of Amnesty International whose secretary was Dr. I. S. Ephson (born 1923), a lawyer, writer and Ghanaian historian. 
 
Between 1974 and 1979 De Graft-Hayford held various portfolios: Special Assistant to the Commissioner for Trade, Special Assistant (Security) to the Commissioner, Cocoa Affairs and Co-Ordinator at the Ministry of Cocoa Affairs, responsible solely to the Commissioner. His Ministry of Cocoa Affairs contract of service ended in 1979.

In 1980, he was Chairman of the Ghana Legion and Advisor to President Hilla Limann at the Cabinet Secretary's request.

From 1981 to 1984, De Graft-Hayford continued as Chairman of the Ghana Legion having been appointed by the Peoples National Democratic Convention PNDC then led by Jerry John Rawlings. In 1984, de Graft-Hayford retired from the Chairmanship of the Ghana Legion and Boxing authority returning to the UK.

Boxing
During the 1930s de Graft-Hayford was a professional boxer under the pseudonym of "The Chocolate Kid".

As a welter-weight boxer, "Chocolate Kid" claimed the Welter-Weight championship and the Sir Arnold Hudson Trophy in 1935. In 1939, in the second round of a friendly non-title bout, he knocked out Jack Pullan, the Far Eastern Command Welterweight Champion, on board the troop ship New Northland.

Between 1974 and 1978, he established the first Ghana Boxing Board of Control and as chairman was instrumental in Ghana acquiring her first world boxing champion, D. K. Poison. De Graft-Hayford later became vice-president of the African Boxing Union and Member of the World Boxing Council.

Family
De Graft-Hayford had two siblings, Dr Mark Davy-Hayford and Mary Ruth Ernestina Edmundson OBE. His mother Matilda Goy was German and his father was the Reverend Mark Christian Hayford MA, DD, FRCS  whose father was the Reverend, Joseph De Graft Hayford, the son of Reverend James Hayford, whose ethnic name was Kwamina Afua.

The Hayford (Afua) family or clan of Cape Coast and Accra includes relations with the surnames Casely Hayford, Davy Hayford, degraft-Johnson, Yankah, Wilson, Welsing, Hutchful, Wilberforce, Graves and Brew, among others.

He was married to Phyllis de Graft-Hayford (née Stiff, 1919–2001), who co-established the first Child Care Centre in Ghana. They have five children.

References

Further reading 
 De-Valera Nym Botchway, Boxing is no cakewalk! Azumah 'Ring Professor' Nelson in the social history of Ghanaian boxing. African Humanities Program, 2019.  (print).

1912 births
2002 deaths
British Army personnel of World War II
British colonial army soldiers
English people of Dutch descent
English people of German descent
English people of Ghanaian descent
Chiefs of Air Staff (Ghana)
Ghanaian male boxers
Ghanaian people of Dutch descent
Ghanaian people of German descent
Ghanaian soldiers
Royal Army Service Corps officers
Welterweight boxers
Civil servants in the Colonial Office
Ghana Army personnel